Zdzisław Karczewski (22 March 1903 – 30 September 1970) was a Polish film actor. He appeared in more than 30 films between 1933 and 1970.

Selected filmography
 Bolek i Lolek (1936)
 Róża (1936)
 Drugi brzeg (1962)
 Black Wings (1963)
 Sami swoi (1967)

References

External links

1903 births
1970 deaths
Polish male film actors
Male actors from Warsaw
People from Warsaw Governorate
Polish male stage actors
20th-century Polish male actors